Support Command was a command of the Royal Air Force between 1973 and 1994. The headquarters was located at RAF Brampton in Cambridgeshire.

History

It was formed on 31 August 1973 by the renaming of RAF Maintenance Command, with No. 90 (Signals) Group being added to it. Its responsibilities included all logistical and maintenance support requirements of the RAF. Among its first stations assigned may have been RAF Gan, transferred from Far East Air Force. It was renamed as RAF Support Command, and its role further increased, on 13 June 1977 when it absorbed Training Command, making it additionally responsible for all RAF ground and aircrew training. In 1982, Support Command had an inventory of 500 aircraft and 49,000 personnel, which included 14,000 civilians and 8,000 trainees.

Support Command undertook training for all officers and other ranks, which was delivered at Biggin Hill, Cosford, Cranwell, Digby, Finningley, Halton, Henlow, Hereford, Leeming, Linton-on-Ouse, Locking, Newton, North Luffenham, St Athan, Sealand, Shawbury, Swinderby, and Valley. One major function of Support Command was facilitating medical training and delivery of medical services. This involved the control of the RAF Hospitals at Ely, Halton, Nocton Hall and Wroughton. Support Command was also responsible for the rehabilitation centres at Chessington and Headley Court.

In the 1980s the bunker at RAF Holmpton was converted to form a new Emergency War Headquarters for RAF Support Command. In the year before it was disbanded (1993), Support Command had 18,144 uniformed personnel under its structure, spread across 40 locations. In October 1985, the HQ building of Support Command at RAF Brampton was destroyed by fire. Staff had to move into temporary accommodation until a new HQ building was built, with the final cost coming in at around £44 million.

In 1994 the Command was split up, with many of its functions merging with those of the RAF Personnel Management Centre to form RAF Personnel and Training Command, and others being hived off into RAF Logistics Command.

Air Officers Commanding-in-Chief
The following officers have held the appointment of Air Officer Commanding-in-Chief RAF Support Command:

31 Aug 1973 - Air Marshal Sir Reginald Harland 
13 Jun 1977 - Air Marshal Sir Rex Roe
30 Aug 1978 - Air Marshal Sir Keith Williamson
3 May 1980 - Air Marshal Sir John Gingell
27 Apr 1981 - Air Marshal Sir Michael Beavis
15 Feb 1984 - Air Marshal Sir David Harcourt-Smith
2 Jan 1986 - Air Marshal Sir John Sutton
5 Apr 1989 - Air Chief Marshal Sir Michael Graydon
8 May 1990 - Air Chief Marshal Sir John Thomson
5 Oct 1992 - Air Chief Marshal Sir John Willis

See also

 List of Royal Air Force commands

References

Sources

Further reading
Jackson, Brendan. "Logistic support in the Royal Air Force." The RUSI Journal 137, no. 6 (1992): 38–43.
Terry Ford GEng MRAeS, (1987) "Royal Air Force Engineering", Aircraft Engineering and Aerospace Technology, Vol. 59 Issue: 11, pp. 11–13, https://doi.org/10.1108/. An opportunity to become acquainted with the engineering expertise available at RAF Stations and to study the degree of involvement in design and manufacture occurred recently when visiting Abingdon and Marham.

 
 

|-

Military units and formations established in 1973
Military units and formations disestablished in 1994
Military units and formations in Cambridgeshire
Organisations based in Cambridgeshire
Support Command